The 2020–21 Persian Gulf Pro League (formerly known as Iran Pro League) were the 38th season of Iran's Football League and 20th as Persian Gulf Pro League since its establishment in 2001. Persepolis were the defending champions. The season featured 14 teams from the 2019–20 Persian Gulf Pro League and two new teams promoted from the 2019–20 Azadegan League: Mes Rafsanjan and Aluminium Arak.

The 2020–21 season started on 6 November 2020 and was ended on 30 July 2021. Persepolis won their record-extending 5th consecutive title and 14th title overall (7th in the Pro League era)

Teams

Stadia and locations

Number of teams by region

Personnel and kits 
Note: Flags indicate national team as has been defined under FIFA eligibility rules. Players may hold more than one non-FIFA nationality.

Managerial changes

Foreign players

The number of foreign players is restricted to four per Persian Gulf Pro League team, including a slot for a player from AFC countries. A team can use four foreign players on the field in each game, including at least one player from the AFC country. 
In bold: Players that have been capped for their national team.

League table

Standings

Results

Positions by round

Season statistics

Top scorers

Hat-tricks

Top assists

Clean Sheets

See also 
 2020–21 Azadegan League
 2020–21 League 2
 2020–21 League 3
 2020–21 Hazfi Cup
 2020 Iranian Super Cup
 2021 AFC Champions League

References 

Iran Pro League seasons
2020–21 in Iranian football
Iran
PGL